2005 European Bowl was the European Championship "B" of korfball, played in Terrassa (Catalonia), from October 27 to 30 of 2005, with the participation of 5 national teams.
The matches were played at Can Jofresa Pavilion. 

This championship "B", played for the first time, gave two places for the 2006 European Korfball Championship, and four for the 2007 Korfball World Championship.

International Korfball Federation decided also to name this championship as Jan Hanekroot, honouring one of the most involucrated person in korfball.

The champions were Catalonia, winning their first continental title ever.

Results

Final standings

See also
International Korfball Federation
Korfball European Bowl

External links
International Federation of Korfbal

Korfball European Bowl
Korfball
Korfball European Bowl
Korfball in Catalonia